Acts 4 is the fourth chapter of the Acts of the Apostles in the New Testament of the Christian Bible. The book containing this chapter is anonymous but early Christian tradition affirmed that Luke composed this book as well as the Gospel of Luke. This chapter records the aftermath of a healing by Simon Peter and his preaching in Solomon's Portico, that Sanhedrin arrested the apostles, but had to let them go.

Text
The original text was written in Koine Greek and is divided into 37 verses.

Textual witnesses
Some early manuscripts containing the text of this chapter are:
 Codex Vaticanus (AD 325–350)
 Codex Sinaiticus (330–360)
 Papyrus 8 (4th century; extant verses 31–37)
 Codex Bezae (~400)
 Codex Alexandrinus (400–440)
 Codex Ephraemi Rescriptus (~450; extant verses 1–2)
 Codex Laudianus (~550)

Old Testament references
 Acts 4:11: Psalm 
 : Psalm 
 : Psalm

New Testament references
 Acts 4:11: ; ; ;

Conflicting reactions (4:1–4)
Peter's speech (Acts 3) was interrupted by the temple authorities who come to silence the apostles, but behind the scenes, more people join the church.

Arrest and trial (4:5–12)
The apostles spent a night in jail (verse 5) and brought before a full session of Sanhedrin the next morning.

Verse 10
[Simon Peter said]: "let it be known to you all, and to all the people of Israel, that by the name of Jesus Christ of Nazareth, whom you crucified, whom God raised from the dead, by Him this man stands here before you whole."
Peter replies to the question of the council (verse 7) on the origin of the healing power by identifying it with Jesus Christ of Nazareth.

Verse 11
[Simon Peter said]: This is the ‘stone which was rejected by you builders, which has become the chief cornerstone.’
Citing Psalm 118:22.

Verse 12
[Simon Peter said]: "Nor is there salvation in any other, for there is no other name under heaven given among men by which we must be saved."
In his last sentence, Peter "goes further than anything he has yet said: Christ is the only mean of salvation."

Deliberation of the council (4:13–22)
Here Luke gives a glimpse of "the inner workings of the Sanhedrin", especially the elitist perspective: perceiving the apostles in verse 13 as 'uneducated and untrained' (not the sense of illiterate but the sense of not having the education level of the elders and the scribes) as well as displaying 'us' and 'them' attitude toward 'the people' (verses 16, 17, 21).

A prophetic prayer (4:23–31)
This section gives a glimpse of "the apostolic circle at prayer", and this particular prayer provides a "theological framework" for "legitimate exercise of free speech in the face of a tyrannical abuse of authority" (verse 29).

Common church life (4:32–37)
A slightly more detailed than in 2:44-45, it notes how money raised from the property sale was "channelled through the apostles" (verse 35) to emphasize "the sense of centralized authority".

Verses 32–35
 All the believers were one in heart and mind. No one claimed that any of their possessions was their own, but they shared everything they had.With great power the apostles continued to testify to the resurrection of the Lord Jesus. And God’s grace was so powerfully at work in them all that there were no needy persons among them. For from time to time those who owned land or houses sold them, brought the money from the sales and put it at the apostles’ feet, and it was distributed to anyone who had need.

Verses 36–37
And Joses, who was also named Barnabas by the apostles (which is translated Son of Encouragement), a Levite of the country of Cyprus, having land, sold it, and brought the money and laid it at the apostles' feet.
 "Barnabas" would later play an important role in the early ministry of Apostle Paul (Acts 11), and, "with typically Lukan economy" of literary device, is introduced here as a character who displays "a positive example of the ideal use of wealth".
"Son of Encouragement": The , can also mean "son of consolation". Another is that it is related to the Hebrew word  meaning "prophet". In the Syriac Bible, the phrase "son of consolation" is translated .

See also
 Barnabas
 Christian socialism
 Christian communism
 From each according to his ability, to each according to his needs
 Jerusalem
 John the Apostle
 Sanhedrin
 Simon Peter
 Solomon
 Related Bible parts: Psalm 2, Psalm 118, Acts 2, Acts 11

References

Sources

External links
 King James Bible - Wikisource
English Translation with Parallel Latin Vulgate
Online Bible at GospelHall.org (ESV, KJV, Darby, American Standard Version, Bible in Basic English)
Multiple bible versions at Bible Gateway (NKJV, NIV, NRSV etc.)

04